Ester Balassini (born 20 October 1977) is an Italian hammer thrower. Her personal best throw is 73.59 metres, achieved in June 2005 in Brixen.

She is the wife of the former discus thrower Cristiano Andrei.

Achievements

National titles
Balassini won five national championships at individual senior level.

Italian Athletics Championships
Hammer throw: 1998, 1999, 2000, 2001, 2005 (5)

References

External links
 

1977 births
Athletes (track and field) at the 2000 Summer Olympics
Athletes (track and field) at the 2004 Summer Olympics
Italian female hammer throwers
Living people
Olympic athletes of Italy
Sportspeople from Bologna
Athletics competitors of Fiamme Gialle
Universiade medalists in athletics (track and field)
World Athletics Championships athletes for Italy
Mediterranean Games gold medalists for Italy
Mediterranean Games silver medalists for Italy
Mediterranean Games medalists in athletics
Athletes (track and field) at the 2001 Mediterranean Games
Athletes (track and field) at the 2005 Mediterranean Games
Universiade bronze medalists for Italy
Competitors at the 1999 Summer Universiade
Competitors at the 2001 Summer Universiade
Medalists at the 2005 Summer Universiade
21st-century Italian women